Christine Winger was a Republican member of the Illinois House of Representatives from the 45th district from 2015 to 2019. The 45th district includes all or parts of  Addison, Bartlett, Bloomingdale, Carol Stream, Hanover Park, Itasca, Medinah, Roselle, Wayne, West Chicago,  and Wood Dale. In the 2018 general election, Winger lost to Democratic candidate Diane Pappas and she is currently a substitute teacher in Itasca.

References

External links
 Profile at Illinois General Assembly website

Living people
Illinois State University alumni
Republican Party members of the Illinois House of Representatives
People from Wood Dale, Illinois
Women state legislators in Illinois
Year of birth missing (living people)
21st-century American politicians
21st-century American women politicians